Lauderhill 6–12 STEM-MED is a magnet school in Lauderhill, Florida that serves the sixth and twelfth grades. It is a part of Broward County Public Schools. The high school portion is the first to open in the city of Lauderhill.

It mostly serves Lauderhill, but also accepts a small portion of Lauderdale Lakes. While the high school is not automatically zoned, people in Lauderhill have priority for admission to the high school.

Lauderhill 6–12 STEM-MED typically accepts graduates of feeders schools: Castle Hill Elementary, Endeavour Primary Learning Center, Lauderhill Paul Turner Elementary, Plantation Elementary School, and Royal Palm Elementary.

Academics 

Academic pathways and programs at Lauderhill 6–12 STEM-MED include a code/game development program, computer science, engineering and robotics.

The school also has a Fire Academy/First Responders Program with the Lauderhill Fire Department. This is a three-year program that prepares cadets for entry into post-graduate fire academies.

Students also have the opportunity to become a Magnet Ambassador (a student leader who serves as a liaison, spokesperson, and advocate for the school). These selected students assist during new student orientation processes, give campus tours, and assist with special events.

Junior Achievement Experience (JA Experience) Program 

High school students are introduced to entrepreneurship, financial literacy, and work readiness. Students participate in team projects and competitions (campus-wide, regional, and national), business boot camps, leadership retreats, and company site visits.

Freshman and sophomores explore career clusters, digital citizenship, strategic decision making, banking & savings, investing & risk management, credit management, budgeting, life planning, and personal spending.

Juniors and seniors participate in SPARK Tank Competitions, business boot camps, and national competitions creating student-managed companies.

Demographics 

As of the 2018–2019 school year, the total enrollment was 875 students. The ethnic makeup of the school was 94.47% Black, 4.26% Hispanic, and 1.04% White. 94.29% of students receive free/reduced lunch while only 5.71% receive full lunch.

References

External links

 Lauderhill 6-12

Schools in Broward County, Florida
Public middle schools in Florida
Public high schools in Florida